Jorge Augusto Gamboa Mendoza (born 27 January 1970) is a Colombian anthropologist and historian. He has been contributing on the knowledge of hispanic and pre-hispanic territories of what is now Colombia, especially the Muisca. Jorge Gamboa speaks Spanish and French.

Biography 
Jorge Gamboa Mendoza was born in Pamplona in the northern department of Norte de Santander. He studied anthropology as an undergraduate at the Universidad Nacional de Colombia in Bogotá from 1988 to 1993 and history from 1993 to 2002 at the same university, graduating with a thesis called El Significado de la dote dentro de las prácticas matrimoniales de la sociedad colonial: El caso de la Provincia de Pamplona de la Nueva Granada a finales del siglo XVI ("The significance of the dowry within the matrimonial practices of the colonial society: The case of the Pamplona Province of the New Kingdom of Granada at the end of the 16th century").

Since 2001 Jorge Gamboa Mendoza is a researcher at the Instituto Colombiano de Antropología e Historia (ICANH) in Bogotá.

Works 
This list is a selection.

Books 
 2010 - Fray Bernardo de Lugo. Gramática en la lengua general del Nuevo Reino, llamada Mosca [1619]
 2010 - El cacicazgo muisca en los años posteriores a la Conquista : del sihipkua al cacique colonial, 1537-1575 
 2010 - La dote matrimonial a finales del siglo XVI : el caso de la provincia de Pamplon aen el Nuevo Reino de Granada, 1574-1630
 2003 - El precio de un marido. El significado de la dote matrimonial en el Nuevo Reino de Granada. Pamplona (1570-1650)
 2002 - Encomienda, identidad y poder. Los encomenderos y conquistadores del Nuevo Reino de Granada vistos a través de las probanzas de méritos y servicios (1550-1650)

Articles 
 2006 - Caciques, encomenderos y santuarios en el Nuevo Reino de Granada: reflexiones metodológicas sobre la ficción en los archivos: el caso del cacique de Tota, 1574-1575
 2004 - La encomienda y las sociedades indígenas del Nuevo Reino de Granada: el caso de la provincia de Pamplona (1549-1650)
 1998 - El régimen de la encomienda en una zona minera de la Nueva Granada, 1549 - 1620
 1997 - La dote matrimonial a finales del siglo XVI. El caso de la Provincia de Pamplona en el Nuevo Reino de Granada, 1574-1630
 1993 - Cabildo y Elites Locales en la Sociedad Colonial: Encomenderos, mineros y comerciantes en la Provincia de Pamplona (1600-1660)

See also 

List of Muisca scholars
Spanish conquest of the Muisca
Muisca

Notable works by Gamboa Mendoza

References

External links 
  Website Jorge Gamboa Mendoza

1970 births
Colombian anthropologists
21st-century Colombian historians
Muisca scholars
National University of Colombia alumni
Living people
People from Pamplona, Norte de Santander
20th-century Colombian historians